Echo is the tenth studio album by Tom Petty and the Heartbreakers. Released in April 1999, the album reached number 10 on the Billboard 200 aided by singles "Free Girl Now", "Swingin'" and "Room at the Top", which hit numbers 5, 17 and 19 respectively on Billboards Mainstream Rock Tracks in 1999. The album was the band's last collaboration with producer Rick Rubin, and was also the last to feature contributions from longtime bassist/vocalist Howie Epstein, who died of a heroin overdose in 2003. Despite still being a member of the band, Epstein is missing from the album's cover photo because he failed to show up for the photo shoot, and Petty ordered it to commence without him. It also marks the first to feature longtime touring member Scott Thurston. Echo was certified Gold (500,000 copies sold) by the RIAA in July 1999, only three months after it was released. Echo is the only Heartbreakers' album to feature a lead vocal from another member of the band: lead guitarist Mike Campbell on "I Don't Wanna Fight".

"Free Girl Now" is also notable for being the second single by a major artist to be made available for free internet download in MP3 format by the artist. Petty's marketing decision caused concern at Warner Bros., and the download was pulled after two days, but propagated thanks to services like Napster.

Track listing

Outtakes
"Sweet William" appeared as the B-side on the "Room at the Top" CD single.
"Gainesville" and "I Don't Belong" were released posthumously as a part of the An American Treasure compilation in 2018.

Personnel
Tom Petty & the Heartbreakers
Tom Petty – rhythm guitars, harmonica, lead and backing vocals
Mike Campbell – guitars (lead, bass), lead vocals on "I Don't Wanna Fight"
Benmont Tench – pianos, organ, chamberlin, clavinet
Howie Epstein – bass guitar, backing vocals

Additional musicians
 Scott Thurston – guitars (acoustic, electric), backing vocals
Steve Ferrone – drums
 Lenny Castro – percussion

Production
 Martyn Atkins – art direction and photography
 Rob Brill – engineer
 Mike Campbell – producer
 Christine Cano – art direction and design
 Richard Dodd – engineer, mixer
 Ok Hee Kim – engineer
 Aaron Lepley – engineer
 Stephen Marcussen – mastering
 Tom Petty – producer
 Rick Rubin – producer
 Dave Schiffman – engineer
 Christine Sirois – engineer

Charts

Weekly charts

Year-end charts

Singles

Certifications

References

Tom Petty albums
1999 albums
Albums produced by Rick Rubin
Albums produced by Tom Petty
Warner Records albums